Events from the year 1843 in Sweden

Incumbents
 Monarch – Charles XIV John

Events
 4 June - The newspaper Nerikes Allehanda begun its publication. 
 Blomsterspråket, historiskt, mythologiskt och poetiskt tecknadt by Wilhelmina Stålberg
 Förhoppingar by Sophie von Knorring
 Crapula Mundi by Lars Levi Læstadius
 Lyriska toner by Wilhelmina Stålberg
 Positiv-hataren by August Blanche

Births
 13 February – Georg von Rosen, painter   (died 1923) 
 20 August – Christina Nilsson, opera singer  (died 1921) 
 14 September – Gurli Åberg, stage actress (died 1922) 
 28 October – Anna Nordlander, painter (died 1879) 
 7 December – Helena Nyblom, children's story author (died 1926) 
 Lilly Engström, first female member of a Board of education (died 1921)

Deaths
 8 July – Lars Hjortsberg, actor (born 1772) 
 1 April - Adolph Ribbing, regicide participator (born 1765)

References

 
Years of the 19th century in Sweden
Sweden